This is a complete list of memorials at the National Memorial Arboretum at Alrewas, near Lichfield, Staffordshire.

The primary memorial at the arboretum is the Armed Forces Memorial which lists all British military casualties since 1948. In addition to the Armed Forces Memorial a further 400 memorials are located on the grounds of the memorial arboretum.

List

0-9
2 Squadron RAF Memorial ; No II (AC) Squadron RAF, Shiny Two
4th Royal Tank Regiment 1916 - 1993 Memorial Altar
8th Army Memorial
8 Group Path Finder Force
9 Squadron RAF
10th Royal Hussars Memorial
11th (Prince Albert's Own) Hussars (The Cherry Pickers) Memorial
9th/12th Royal Lancers Memorial
17th Dogra Regiment Memorial
30 Squadron Association Memorial
31 Squadron RAF Memorial
36th Ulster Division
41 Club Memorial
45 Commando, 'Baker' Troop
47 Squadron RAF Memorial
49 Squadron Memorial
90 Signals Unit Memorial ; TCU
214 Squadron RAF Memorial
624 (Special Duties) Squadron RAF Memorial
1940 Dunkirk Veterans' Association Memorial

A-Z

Adjutant General's Corps Commemorative Garden
Aguila Memorial (WRNS) (Wrens)
Air Formation and Air Support Signals Memorial
Aircrew Association Memorial
Allied Special Forces Association Grove
Allied Special Forces Association Sun Room
Ambulance Services
Ancient Burial Mound
Anglo-Japanese Peace Garden
Arctic Convoys Memorial: Russian Convoys
Argyll and Sutherland Highlanders Memorial ; Royal Scottish Regiment
Armed Forces Memorial
Armed Services Wood
Army Air Corps Memorial
Army Apprentice National Memorial
Army Benevolent Fund - The Soldiers' Charity: ABF
Army Commandos Memorial
Army Dog Unit (Northern Ireland) Association Red Paw Memorial
Army Parade
Army Wood
Association of Jewish Ex-Servicemen and Women Memorial
Athel Shipping Line Memorial
Auxiliary Territorial Service / Ack Ack Memorial
Auxiliary Territorial Service Statue 
Baluch Regiment  Memorial
Basra Memorial Wall
Bastion Memorial - The Bastion Memorial commemorates British casualties of the War in Afghanistan (2001–2021).
Battle of Mirbat Memorial
Battle of the River Plate Memorial
Bevin Boys Memorial
Bidadari Cemetery Memorial
Birmingham Children's Hospital
BLESMA -  The Limbless Veteran's Orchard.
Blind Veterans UK (St Dunstan's) Pathway
Blown Away
Blues and Royals
Bomb Disposal Memorial: Explosive Ordnance Disposal
Boys' Brigade
Brigade of Gurkhas Memorial
British Berlin Airlift Memorial
British German Friendship Garden
British Korean Veterans Association (BKVA)
British Limbless Ex-Service Men's Association  (BLESMA). The Limbless Veteran's Garden.
British Nuclear Test Veterans Memorial (BNTV)
British South Africa Police Memorial
BRIXMIS Memorial
Brotherhood of Greek Veterans Chapel (Greek Grove)
Burma Railway
Burma Star Memorial
Cadet Forces' Memorial
Captain Class Frigates Memorial
Cardiac Risk in the Young, Dawn, Dusk
Care of Police Survivors (also known as COPS)
Castle Class Corvettes Memorial
Catenian Association, The
Cavalry Grove (Crescent)
Celebration of Life Grove (Co-op)
Changi Lych Gate
Cheltenham College Memorial

Cheshire Regiment Memorial Bench
Children's Woodland
Chindit Memorial
Christmas Truce Memorial; Football Remembers
Church Lads' and Church Girls' Brigade
Civil Defence
Civil Defence George Cross Awards
Clan, Houston, Scottish Shire, Bullard and King Line Steamers Memorial
Coastal Command Grove
Cockleshell Heroes Memorial
Combined Operations Memorial
Cyprus Emergency (1955-1959) Memorial
Defensively Equipped Merchant Ships (DEMS) Memorial
Devonshire and Dorset Regiment
Diamond Grove
Dieppe Raid Memorial
Douglas Skene Grove
Duke of Lancaster's Regiment Memorial
Duke of York's Military School
Durham Light Infantry Memorial 
Edward's Trust Garden
Escape Lines Memorial ; Home Run
Essex Regiment Memorial
Ex-National Servicemen's Memorial 
Far East Air Force Memorial
Far East Prisoners of War Grove (FEPOW Grove)
Far East Prisoners of War Memorial Building (FEPOW)
Fauld Explosion Memorial
Fellowship of the Services Memorial
Fire and Rescue Services Memorial
Fleet Air Arm British Pacific and East Indies Fleets Aircrew Memorial
Fleet Air Arm Memorial
Foresters Friendly Society Memorial
Free Spirit Horse Memorial 
Gallipoli Memorial
Garden of the Innocents
GCHQ Memorial
General Post Office Memorial Garden (GPO)
George Cross Island Association (Malta) Memorial
Gibraltar Memorial
Gift of Life Memorial: Donor Family Network
Girls Venture Corps Memorial
Glider Pilot Regiment Memorial
Golden Grove
Gordon Highlanders
Green Howards
Guinea Pig Club Memorial
Gulf War 1990-1991 Memorial 
Heroes' Square
Hiroshima Stone
HM Ships Glorious, Acasta and Ardent Memorial
HMS Antelope Garden
HMS Ardent Memorial
HMS Argonaut Memorial
HMS Barham Memorial
HMS Bruce Memorial
HMS Bulwark, Albion and Centaur Memorial
HMS Caledonia Memorial
HMS Cavalier Memorial
HMS Cossack Memorial
HMS Dunedin Memorial
HMS Formidable Memorial
HMS Gambia Memorial
HMS Ganges Memorial
HMS Glory Memorial
HMS Hood Memorial
HMS Kenya Memorial
HMS Neptune and Kandahar Memorial
HMS Prince of Wales and HMS Repulse Memorial
HMS Royal Arthur Memorial
HMT Lancastria Memorial
Home Front Memorial
Home Service Force Memorial
Hong Kong Volunteer Defence Corps Memorial
Household Division Memorial
Hunt Class Destroyers Memorial 
Inner Wheel Grove
Institute of Quarrying Garden
Intelligence Corps Memorial
International Military Music Society
Iraq / Afghanistan Willows
Irish Infantry Grove
Italy Star Association 1943 - 1945
Japanese Hell Ships Memorial 
Kenya Police Memorial
Kingfisher Wood
King's African Rifles Memorial
King's Royal Hussars Memorial
King's Shropshire Light Infantry Memorial
Ladysmith Memorial
Leonard Cheshire Amphitheatre
Lichfield and District Garden
Lichfield Wood
Life Guards Memorial
Light Dragoons Memorial
Light Infantry (The Rifles) Memorial
Lions Club International Shelter
Lisbon Maru Memorial - A memorial to the victims of the sinking of the Lisbon Maru ship was unveilled in 2021.
Loch Class Frigates Memorial
LST and Landing Craft Memorial
Malaya and Borneo Veterans Memorial
Malayan Volunteer Force Memorial
Masonic Masons (Freemasons) Memorial
Master Mariners Sundial
Mediterranean Campaigns of World War 2
Merchant Navy Association Memorial
Merchant Navy Convoy Wood
Mercian Volunteers Memorial
Mercian Wood
Military Medallists' Memorial
Millennium Chapel of Peace and Forgiveness
Millennium Wood
Monte Cassino Association Memorial
Moussey Memorial Seat 
National Association of Memorial Masons
National Ex-Prisoner of War Association Memorial
Naval Service Memorial
Navy Wood
Neutral Irish Registered Vessels Memorial
Normandy Veterans Memorial
Northern Ireland Prison Service Memorial
Northern Rhodesia Police Memorial
Not Forgotten Association Memorial
Nursing Memorial, The
Nyasaland Police Memorial
Ocean Fairway Blue Funnel Line Memorial
Ocean Fairway Elder Dempster Line Memorial
Oddfellows
Operation Market Garden: Market Garden Veterans' Association Memorial
Orange Institution Memorial 
Palestine Police Old Comrades' Association Memorial
Palestine Veterans' Association Memorial
Parachute Regiment and Airborne Forces Memorial
Parachute Squadron Royal Armoured Corps Memorial
Pegasus Bridge Memorial
Phantom Memorial
Polar Bear Memorial: 49th West Riding Division
Police Service Northern Ireland (PSNI) Memorial
Polish Forces War Memorial
Poppy Memorial ; 'RBL Never Forget Tribute Garden'
Popski's Private Army
Posted - Service Children's Education Memorial
Prince of Wales's Own Regiment of Yorkshire
Princess Mary's RAF Nursing Service (PMRAFNS) Memorial 
Palestine Police Old Comrades' Association Memorial
Palestine Veterans' Association Memorial
Parachute Regiment and Airborne Forces Memorial
Parachute Squadron Royal Armoured Corps Memorial
Pegasus Bridge Memorial
Phantom Memorial
Polar Bear Memorial: 49th West Riding Division
Police Service Northern Ireland (PSNI) Memorial
Polish Forces War Memorial
Poppy Memorial ; 'RBL Never Forget Tribute Garden'
Popski's Private Army
Posted - Service Children's Education Memorial
Prince of Wales's Own Regiment of Yorkshire
Princess Mary's RAF Nursing Service (PMRAFNS) Memorial 
Quaker Services Memorial
Queen Alexandra's Royal Army Nursing Corps Memorial
Queen Alexandra's Royal Navy Nursing Service and the Voluntary Aid Detachment Memorial
Queen's Lancashire Regiment 1970-2006
Queen's Own Buffs - The Royal Kent Regiment
Queen's Own Highlanders Memorial
Queen's Regiment Memorial
Queen's Royal Hussars Memorial
Queen's Royal Lancers Memorial 
RAC Future Forests
RAF Administrative Apprentices Memorial
RAF Air Loadmasters' Association Memorial
RAF Barrage Balloons Memorial
RAF Benevolent Fund Memorial
RAF Flight and Air Engineers Memorial
RAF Locking Memorial
RAF Medical Services Memorial
RAF Physical Training Instructors
RAF Search and Rescue Memorial
Rail Industry Memorial
Reconciliation Stone
Remembrance Glade
Rhodesian African Rifles and Rhodesia Native Regiment Memorial
Rhodesian Air Force Memorial
Roadpeace Wood
Rotary International Memorial
Rotary Ridge
Royal Air Force Boy Entrants Memorial
Royal Air Force Cranwell Apprentices Memorial
Royal Air Force Halton Apprentices Memorial Garden
Royal Air Force Police Memorial
Royal Air Force Regiment Memorial
Royal Air Force Servicing Commando and Tactical Supply Wing Association Memorial
Royal Air Force Wing
Royal Air Force Wood
Royal Air Forces Association Remembrance Garden (RAFA)
Royal and Sun Alliance Memorials
Royal Army Chaplains Memorial
Royal Army Dental Corps (RADC) Memorial
Royal Army Medical Corps (RAMC) Memorial
Royal Army Physical Training Corps (RAPTC) Memorial
Royal Army Veterinary Corps (RAVC) Memorial
Royal Artillery Garden
Royal Australian Air Force Memorial
Royal Auxiliary Air Force Memorial
Royal British Legion Poppy Field
Royal Canadian Air Force Memorial
Royal Corps of Signals Memorial
Royal Dragoon Guards Memorial
Royal Electrical and Mechanical Engineers (REME) Memorial
Royal Engineers (RE) Memorial
Royal Fleet Auxiliary Memorial
Royal Fleet Auxiliary Ship 'Sir Percivale' Anchor
Royal Gloucestershire, Berkshire and Wiltshire Regiment Memorial
Royal Green Jackets Memorial
Royal Hampshire Regiment Memorial
Royal Hong Kong Police Memorial
Royal Indian Navy and Indian Army Memorial
Royal Leicestershire Regiment Memorial ; Leicestershire Tigers
Royal Logistic Corps Memorial
Royal Mail Association Memorial
Royal Malaysia Police Memorial
Royal Marines Association Memorial
Royal Military Police Association Memorial
Royal National Lifeboat Institution (RNLI)
Royal Naval Association Uttoxeter Memorial
Royal Naval Medical Services Memorial
Royal Naval Patrol Service Memorial ; 'HMS Europa, (RNPS)'
Royal Naval Review
Royal Navy Coastal Forces Memorial
Royal Navy Engineers Benevolent Society Memorial
Royal Norfolk Regiment, Suffolk Regiment and Cambridgeshire Regiment Memorial ; Anglian Regiment
Royal Norwegian Navy
Royal Observer Corps
Royal Regiment of Fusiliers (Original) Memorial
Royal Regiment of Fusiliers Memorial
Royal Regiment of Scotland
Royal Scots Dragoon Guards
Royal Tank Regiment
Royal Ulster Constabulary George Cross Way: RUC GC Way
Royal Welsh Regiment Memorial
Salvation Army Memorial
Sapper Support
Scouting Memorial
Second Tactical Air Force Memorial
Sensory Play Garden
Shackleton Association Memorial
Shaw, Saville and Albion Ltd Memorial
Sherwood Rangers Yeomanry Memorial
Shot at Dawn Memorial
Showmen's Guild of Great Britain

Shrievalty Avenue
Shropshire Yeomanry Memorial Plinth
Sikh Memorial
Small Arms School Corps Memorial
Soldiers, Sailors, Airmen and Families Association (SSAFA) Memorial
Soroptimist International
South Atlantic Medal Association memorial and the Antelope Garden ; 'Falkland Islands Campaign Memorial'
Special Constabulary Memorial
Spiritualists' National Union Memorial
St John Volunteers Memorial
Staff Sergeant Phil Currass Memorial
Staffordshire Regiment Memorial
Staffordshire Yeomanry Memorial
Stillbirth and Neonatal Death Charity Memorial (SANDS)
Stirling X9-Y, 299 Squadron Memorial
Submariners Association Memorial
Suez Maru Memorial
Suez Veterans Association
Sultan of Oman's Armed Forces Memorial
Sumatra Railway 
The Beat (Police Memorial Avenue)
The Fisgard Association Memorial
The London Scottish Regiment Memorial
The National Memorial To The Evacuation (The British Evacuees Association)
The Royal Antediluvian Order of Buffaloes Memorial
Tobruk Memorial
TOC H Memorial
Ton Class Minesweepers Memorial
Townswomen's Guild
Trefoil Guild Memorial
TS Exmouth Memorial
TS Indefatigable Memorial
TS Mercury, HMS Worcester, Conway, SATS General Botha, Nautical College Pangbourne Memorial
TS Vindicatrix Memorial
Twin Towers Memorial
Type 21 Frigates Memorial 
Ulster Ash Grove
Ulster Ash Grove Memorial
Ulster Defence Regiment CGC Memorial
Ulster Defence Regiment Memorial
Ulster Special Constabulary Memorial
Union Castle Line Memorial
United Nations Avenue ; UN 
Vera Atkins - SOE Memorial
Victims of Overseas Terrorism
Victoria Cross Commemorative Paving Stones: WW1 VC Paviours 
War Widows' Memorial
War Widows' Rose Garden
War Widows' Wood
Watersmeet
Western Front Association Grove
Western Front Association Memorial
Women's Auxiliary Air Force (WAAF) Memorial
Women's Auxiliary Service - The Chinthe Women Memorial
Women's Institute Memorial Seat:  WI Wall
Women's Land Army and Timber Corps Memorial
Women's Royal Army Corps Memorial (WRAC)
Women's Royal Naval Service (WRNS) (Wrens)
Women's Section Memorial, The Royal British Legion
Wooden Minesweepers Memorial
Y Group Memorial
Yantze Incident Memorial
Yeomanry Avenue
YMCA Memorial
Yorkshire Regiment Memorial

References

External links

National Memorial Arboretum - List of memorials

Lists of monuments and memorials in the United Kingdom
National Memorial Arboretum